Encore Theatre Magazine is an online magazine relating to contemporary theatre published in the United Kingdom.

History
Encore Theatre Magazine begun publication in May 2003. It was inspired by the defunct magazine of the same title (Encore), which had a brief but influential life from 1954 to 1965. The magazine describes its history thus:

 

Articles published in the original Encore were reprinted in a volume entitled The Encore Reader: A Chronicle of New Drama. According to Robert Brustein, the original magazine Encore embodied both the virtues and the failings of the movement it examined; he criticizes it for being "bursting with energy, vigor, and excitement" but being "seriously lacking in balanced judgments or penetrating ideas."

References

General references
Brandt, G.W.  Rev. of The Encore Reader: A Chronicle of the New Drama, ed. by Charles Marowitz, Tom Milne, and Owen Hale.  The Modern Language Review 62.1 (Jan. 1967): 123–25.

Inline citations

External links
 

Online magazines published in the United Kingdom
Entertainment magazines published in the United Kingdom
Magazines established in 2003
Theatre magazines
Monthly magazines published in the United Kingdom